Deh-e Morghi (also Romanized as Deh-e Morghī and Deh Morghī; also known as Morghi Deh Morghi) is a village in Saadatabad Rural District, Pariz District, Sirjan County, Kerman Province, Iran. At the 2006 census, its population was 121, in 35 families.

References 

Populated places in Sirjan County